Ryan Arthur Benjamin (born November 17, 1977) is a former American football long snapper of the National Football League. He was signed by the Tampa Bay Buccaneers as an undrafted free agent in 2001. He played college football at South Florida.

He won a Super Bowl ring as a member of the 2002 Tampa Bay Buccaneers.

Early years
Benjamin attended River Ridge High School in New Port Richey, Florida, where he lettered in both football and baseball. He earned all-conference and All-North Suncoast honors his senior year as a defensive tackle. He then played college football at the University of South Florida.

NFL career
Benjamin signed with the Tampa Bay Buccaneers as an undrafted free agent following the 2001 NFL Draft. He was also a member of the New England Patriots that offseason and played one game for the Chicago Bears in place of an injured Patrick Mannelly.

The next season, he would temporarily be back with the New England Patriots before being re-signed by the Buccaneers and winning in Super Bowl XXXVII.

Personal life
Benjamin is married to high school sweetheart Theresa. While at USF, he majored in political science and was the head coach at River Ridge High School through the 2021 fall season.

References

1977 births
Living people
American football long snappers
South Florida Bulls football players
Tampa Bay Buccaneers players
New England Patriots players
Chicago Bears players
People from New Port Richey, Florida
People from Greenfield, Massachusetts